Plači, zemljo is the twelfth studio album by the Serbian singer Dragana Mirković. It was released in 1995.

Track listing
Plači, zemljo
I u dobru i u zlu
Vrati mi se ti
Oslobodi me
Jedan život je
Zato mi je žao
Stani, suzo, stani
Sve me na tebe podseća
Još uvek te ludo volim
Volela bih da te vidim
Uzeo si moja jutra
Divlja devojka (featuring Nino)

References

1995 albums
Dragana Mirković albums